Firuzabad (also Romanized as Fīrūzābād; also known as Gowhar Posht) is a village in Bampur-e Sharqi Rural District, in the Central District of Bampur County, Sistan and Baluchestan Province, Iran. At the 2006 census, its population was 224, in 52 families.

References 

Populated places in Bampur County